On November 3, 2020 El Paso County elected the mayor of El Paso, Texas, four members of city council (districts 2, 3, 4, and 7), two county commissioners, county sheriff, state senator, and five state representatives. El Pasoans voted for members of the House of Representatives of the United States from the 16th and 23rd districts of Texas, district attorney (which also represents Hudspeth and Culberson counties), United States senator, and president of the United States.

The city elections (for mayor and council) are non-partisan, and therefore have no primary election. However, if no candidate wins a majority there will be a run-off election.

Mayor

Candidates
 Veronica Carbajal, attorney with Texas RioGrande Legal Aid
 Carlos Gallinar, former El Paso city government and former EPISD official (Party preference: Democratic)
 Oscar Leeser, former mayor (Party preference: Democratic)
 Dee Margo, incumbent mayor and former member of the Texas House of Representatives (Party preference: Republican)
 Dean Martinez, United States military veteran
 Calvin Zielsdorf, paramedic and high school swimming coach

First round results

Runoff results

City council elections

District 2
District 2 incumbent Alexsandra Annello won re-election for a second term in the December runoff election.

First round results

Runoff results

District 3
District 3 incumbent Cassandra Hernandez-Brown was re-elected to a second term.

District 4
District 4 incumbent Sam Morgan lost re-election in a December runoff to Joe Molinar.

Runoff results

District 7
District 7 incumbent Henry Rivera was re-elected to a second term.

County sheriff

The incumbent Sheriff, Richard Wiles, won the Democratic primary. Because no other candidate challenged him, he was automatically re-elected.

Democratic

County Commission elections

Precinct 1

The incumbent, Carlos Leon, was unopposed in the primary and general election.

Democratic

Precinct 3

The incumbent, Vincent Perez, was defeated in the primary by Illiana Holguin, who went on to win the general election.

Democratic

Runoff results

Republican

General election

State senator (district 29)

Candidates
 Cesar Blanco, state representative (district 76)

Potential candidates
 Dori Fenenbock, former EPISD school board member

Declined candidates
 José Rodríguez, incumbent senator

State representative (district 76)

Candidates
 Claudia Ordaz Perez, city council member
 Elisa Tamayo, former employee of state representative Cesar Blanco

Potential candidates
 Joe Pickett, former state representative (district 79)

Declined candidates
 Cesar Blanco, incumbent

State representative (district 77)

Candidates
Lina Ortega, incumbent representative

State representative (district 78)

Candidates
 Joe Moody, incumbent representative

Potential candidates
 Dori Fenenbock, former EPISD school board member

State representative (district 79)

Candidates
 Art Fierro, incumbent representative

Potential candidates
 Joe Pickett, former representative

District Attorney

Candidates

Democratic
 James Montoya, prosecutor
 Yvonne Rosales, lawyer

Declined candidates
 Jaime Esparza, incumbent district attorney
 Joe Moody, state representative

U.S. Representative (TX-16)

Republican

Potential candidates
 Blanca Trout, Canutillo ISD school board trustee and El Paso County Republican Party vice chair

See also
 2020 Texas elections

References

External links
Official campaign websites for mayoral candidates
 Veronica Carbajal (I) for Mayor
 Carlos Gallinar (I) for Mayor 
 Oscar Leeser (D) for Mayor
 Dee Margo (R) for Mayor 

Official campaign websites for City Council District 2 candidates
 Alexsandra Annello (I) for City Council

Official campaign websites for City Council District 4 candidates
 Wesley Lawrence (I) for City Council
 Sam Morgan (I) for City Council

Official campaign websites for City Council District 7 candidates
 Aaron J. Montes (I) for City Council 
 Henry Rivera (I) for City Council

Official campaign websites for County Commission Precinct 3 candidates
 Iliana Holguin (D) for County Commissioner 

Official campaign websites for State Senate District 29 candidates
 Cesar Blanco (D) for State Senator

Official campaign websites for State Representative District 76 candidates
 Claudia Ordaz Perez (D) for State Representative 

Official campaign websites for State Representative District 77 candidates
 Evelina Ortega (D) for State Representative

El Paso
El Paso, Texas
Government of El Paso
El Paso 2017
Non-partisan elections